Richard Brennan (1886 - 7 March 1963) was an Irish hurler whose championship career with the Kilkenny senior team spanned nine years from 1904 to 1913.

Born in Kilkenny, Brennan first played competitive hurling in his youth. He quickly became involved with the Erin's Own club, eventually becoming a key member of the senior team.

Brennan made his debut on the inter-county scene when he was picked on the Kilkenny senior team for the first time in 1904. He won his first All-Ireland medal that year, however, he was later dropped from the starting team. Brennan remained on the panel during Kilkenny's first great era and was recalled to the team in 1913. He won a second All-Ireland medal that year, while he also won two Leinster medals.

Honours

Cork
All-Ireland Senior Hurling Championship (2): 1904, 1913
Leinster Senior Hurling Championship (5): 1904 (sub), 1913

References

1886 births
1963 deaths
Erin's Own (Kilkenny) hurlers
Kilkenny inter-county hurlers
All-Ireland Senior Hurling Championship winners